Harold Whitehouse may refer to:
 Harold C. Whitehouse, American architect
 Harold Leslie Keer Whitehouse, British botanist and bryologist
 Harold Beckwith Whitehouse, professor of midwifery and diseases of women